Bayé  is a village and rural commune in the Cercle of Kéniéba in the Kayes Region of south-western Mali. The commune contains 17 villages and in the 2009 census had a population of 16,093.

References

External links
.

Communes of Kayes Region